was a Japanese businessman and art patron. He was the 10th richest man in the world in 1987 according to Forbes, with a net worth of 4.0 billion dollars.

Early life
He is the son of Shinjiro Torii who founded Suntory.  The Japanese company is a maker of beer and whiskey.

Career
Saji was the founder of the Suntory Art Museum and the Suntory Music Foundation in Tokyo.

See also
 69421 Keizosaji

References

20th-century Japanese businesspeople
People from Osaka
1919 births
1999 deaths